The 3rd Parliament of the Province of Canada was summoned in 1848, following the general election for the Legislative Assembly in January 1848. The first session was held at Montreal, Canada East. In 1849, rioters protesting the Rebellion Losses Bill burned the parliament buildings. The remaining sessions were held in Toronto.  The Parliament was dissolved on November 6, 1851.

During the 1849 session of this parliament, a number of important bills were passed:
 the Act to provide for the Indemnification of Parties in Lower Canada whose Property was destroyed during the Rebellion in the years 1837 and 1838 (Rebellion Losses Bill)
 the Baldwin Act, also known as the Municipal Corporations Act, which replaced the local government system based on district councils in Canada West by government at the county level. It also granted more autonomy to townships, villages, towns and cities.
 the Amnesty Act which offered pardons to all those involved in the Rebellions of 1837-8.

In 1850, legislation was passed to regulate the operation of the postal service and to establish a post on the Executive Council for the Postmaster General for the Province of Canada.

The Speaker of this parliament was Augustin Norbert Morin.

Canada East - 42 seats

Canada West - 42 seats

References 

Upper Canadian politics in the 1850s, Underhill (and others), University of Toronto Press (1967)

External links 
 Ontario's parliament buildings ; or, A century of legislation, 1792-1892 : a historical sketch
Journals of the Legislative Assembly of the Province of Canada ..., Desbarats & Cary (1848)
  Assemblée nationale du Québec (French)

03